Paul Ahern (born 1 August 1996) is a former professional Australian rules footballer who played for the Greater Western Sydney Giants and the North Melbourne Football Club in the Australian Football League (AFL). He was originally drafted by the Greater Western Sydney Giants with their third selection and seventh overall in the 2014 national draft. After failing to play a senior match in his two seasons with the Giants due to a number of injuries including two knee reconstructions, he was traded to North Melbourne during the 2016 trade period. He made his debut in the fifty-four point win against Brisbane in round eleven of the 2018 season, one year after being traded to North Melbourne.

As at May 2021, Ahern is playing for the Northern Bullants in the Victorian Football League (VFL).

References

External links

1996 births
Living people
North Melbourne Football Club players
Calder Cannons players
Preston Football Club (VFA) players
Australian rules footballers from Victoria (Australia)
Indigenous Australian players of Australian rules football